Garden Expo Park station is a station on Line 14 of the Beijing Subway. It opened on May 5, 2013.

Station Layout 
The station has 2 elevated side platforms.

Exits 
There are 4 exits, lettered A, B1, B2, and C. Exits A, B2, and C are accessible.

See also 
 Beijing Garden Expo Park

References

Railway stations in China opened in 2013
Beijing Subway stations in Fengtai District